Ngajat is popular family of dances among the Iban people in Sarawak, Malaysia; Temburong District, Brunei and West Kalimantan, Indonesia.

Types 

Ngajat consists of several types, including:
 Ngajat Induk
 Ngajat Bebunoh: Presented by the young men of the community, this dance is a replication or repetition of what men do when confronted by enemies or as they engage in daily activities such as hunting.
 Ngajat Lesong: Only men are allowed perform the ngajat lesong because it requires that male dancers  dance while "biting the fly." This dance requires strength and bravery because dancers need to carry a 40-pound weight (the fly) by biting it.
 Ngajat Semain
 Ngajat Berayah
 Ngajat Pua Kumbu: Usually performed by women. As this dance is called Pua kumbu, the dancers would dance while carrying Pua kumbu (Iban floral fabric) as a tool in their performance. This dance is usually performed during Gawai Kelingkang. During Gawai Kelingkang, celebrated to prepare or mark the success of the notorious Ngayau (headhunting), a parade of warriors carrying the head of an enemy approaching the longhouse would be greeted by dancers. The head heroine of the Kelingkang would then put the ‘nutmeg’ in the comb. With a shout of victory and the sound of a bat, the Pua kumbu dancers lead the procession towards the ‘tanju’ (outer platform of the longhouse), swinging a crocodile that contains the enemy’s head in the back while calling for protection from the captive spirit. Before the parade of maidens reaches the stage of the ceremony, a pig will be offered to the ancestors. The pua kumbu dancers will then continue to swing the enemy’s head, followed by the warrior. After seven rounds, the head will be hung on a tree. Today, the enemy’s head is replaced with a coconut as a symbol.
 Ngajat Kuta: Ngajat kuta is another type of dance performance that combines male and female dancers. It is usually performed for celebrations such as the opening of Iban cultural events.
 Ngajat Ngalu Temuai: Presented for the purpose of welcoming special guests. Usually this dance is performed during the opening of an official ceremony attended by many honored guests and the public. The dance is performed while accompanying guests to the leader of the longhouse. This dance is a welcome for guests who come to the long house during Gawai or during other festivals.
 Ngajat Ngemai antu pala: Ngajat for those Iban is a welcome dance during Gawai Day, before the war and after the harvest season. In the old days the dance was performed after their return from the war. Dancers stand on the circle and jump accompanied by the music. For Gawai Sandau Ari, a drum is played for the guests of honor. In a variant, the dancer holds a wooden shield in his left hand and a sword in his right hand and dances facing the enemy with his body swinging to the left and to the right.

Musical equipment

Musical instruments include large and medium gongs (bebendai), drums or dedumba and a set of small gongs engkurumong. PEH is string instrument.

Clothing

Male dancers wear traditional costumes like 'mesh', 'Gagung' or bird clothes. Gagung is a kind of thick and hard armor made of animal skin such as bear, but not stitched on the sides. Dancers also wear hats decorated with feathers.

Female dancers dubbed "kumang", they wear clothes such as a headdress, hooks high on the chest, cloth tied at the waist, hands and feet bracelets and earrings.

References

External links
 Ngajat
 Home Ministry of Culture, Arts and Tourism

Dances of Malaysia
Dances of Indonesia